Euseius ruiliensis is a species of mite in the family Phytoseiidae.

References

ruiliensis
Articles created by Qbugbot
Animals described in 1985